The women's heavyweight (+84 kilograms) event at the 2006 Asian Games took place on 10 December 2006 at Qatar SC Indoor Hall, Doha, Qatar.

A total of thirteen competitors from thirteen different countries competed in this event, limited to fighters whose body weight was more than 84 kilograms. 

Kim Hak-hwan from South Korea won the gold medal after beating Mehdi Navaei of Iran in gold medal match 2–0, The bronze medal was shared by Abdulqader Al-Adhami from Qatar and Liu Xiaobo of China. Nakul Malhotra from India, Faisal Mahmood from Pakistan, Rami Abu-Hawelah of Palestine and Sagynysh Kalimbetov from Kazakhstan they all lost in quarterfinal round and shared the fifth place. Five more athletes lost in the first round and finished ninth.

Schedule
All times are Arabia Standard Time (UTC+03:00)

Results

References
Results

External links
Official website

Taekwondo at the 2006 Asian Games